Rohan Taylor (born 8 January 1965) is a Jamaican cricketer. He played in one List A and five first-class matches for the Jamaican cricket team in 1990/91 and 1991/92.

See also
 List of Jamaican representative cricketers

References

External links
 

1965 births
Living people
Jamaican cricketers
Jamaica cricketers
People from Clarendon Parish, Jamaica